Joshua Eagle and David Rikl were the defending champions but Eagle chose not to compete this year. Rikl instead competed with Leander Paes.

Rikl defended his title with Paes, defeating František Čermák and Leoš Friedl in the final, 6–3, 6–3.

Seeds
Champion seeds are indicated in bold text while text in italics indicates the round in which those seeds were eliminated.

  Leander Paes /  David Rikl (champions)
  Wayne Arthurs /  Paul Hanley (first round)
  Tomáš Cibulec /  Cyril Suk (first round)
  František Čermák /  Leoš Friedl (final)

Draw

External links
 2003 Allianz Suisse Open Gstaad Doubles Draw

Swiss Open (tennis)
2003 ATP Tour
2003 Allianz Suisse Open Gstaad